Theresa Frances Veronica Burke is a Canadian writer, journalist and producer for the CBC's television newsmagazine, The Fifth Estate. She was born in Toronto.

On May 20, 1999, Burke was on the telephone with bank robber Ty Conn, an escapee from the Kingston Penitentiary (one of Canada's most secure prisons) when he shot himself as the police were attempting his re-arrest. She co-authored Who Killed Ty Conn (2001) with Linden MacIntyre.

She won a Canadian Association of Journalists award in 2000 for her work on "His Word Against History", a Fifth Estate production about the life of Steven Truscott, a Canadian man who was convicted of murder in 1959.

Burke has a child with writer Rick Salutin.

References

External links
 Who Killed Ty Conn. (Linden Macintyre & Theresa Burke). Penguin Group Canada, October 11, 2001. Retrieved March 30, 2011.

Living people
Canadian women journalists
Canadian women non-fiction writers
Journalists from Toronto
Writers from Toronto
20th-century Canadian journalists
21st-century Canadian journalists
Year of birth missing (living people)
20th-century Canadian women writers